Ceridwen or Cerridwen is a legendary Celtic female figure.

The name may also refer to:

Ceridwen Dovey (born 1980), South African-Australian social anthropologist and author
Cerridwen Fallingstar (born 1952), American wiccan priestess, shamanic witch, and author
Ceridwen Fraser (born 1979), Australian bio-geographer
Ceridwen Peris, pseudonym of Alice Gray Jones (1852–1943), Welsh writer and editor

Welsh feminine given names